Mark Farrell (born 1966) is a Canadian comedian and writer, who honed his talent in the Yuk Yuk's comedy club in Halifax, Nova Scotia before moving to Toronto in 1989. In 1992,  Farrell helped lead an exodus from the Yuk Yuk's chain, along with other prominent comics such as Brent Butt. After appearing in CBC's Comics! as well as CTV's Comedy Now!, as well as NBC's Friday Night Videos, he was cast in two Ken Finkleman series, Married Life and the first season of The Newsroom.

Eventually his writing skills were noted, and as he became a writer for award-winning This Hour Has 22 Minutes, eventually moving all the way up to Executive Producer, until he left the show in 2010. His work on 22 Minutes led to many other writing gigs, including another job as Supervising Producer for the first season of Corner Gas, a show for which he continued to write and helped develop.

He was an Executive Producer and writer for the show Seed, a show he co-developed with the show's creator, Joseph Raso. The program ran for 26 episodes in 2013-14.

Notes

External links 
 

1968 births
Living people
Canadian stand-up comedians
Canadian comedy writers
Canadian male television actors
Canadian television producers
Canadian television writers
Canadian people of Irish descent
Comedians from Toronto
Male actors from Halifax, Nova Scotia
Male actors from Toronto
Writers from Halifax, Nova Scotia
Writers from Toronto
Canadian male television writers
Canadian male comedians
Comedians from Nova Scotia
Canadian Comedy Award winners